Scott Johnson is a former American football coach.  He served as the head football coach at Southern Oregon College—now known as Southern Oregon University in Ashland, Oregon for eight seasons, from 1972 until 1979.  His record at Southern Oregon was 34–40.

Head coaching record

Notes

References

Year of birth missing (living people)
Living people
Southern Oregon Raiders football coaches